Fayette County Courthouse may refer to:

Fayette County Courthouse (Alabama), Fayette, Alabama
 Fayette County Courthouse (Georgia), Fayetteville, Georgia
 Fayette County Courthouse (Illinois), Vandalia, Illinois
 Fayette County Courthouse (Indiana),Connersville, Indiana
 Fayette County Courthouse (Iowa), West Union, Iowa
 Fayette County Courthouse (Ohio), Washington Courthouse, Ohio
 Fayette County Courthouse (Tennessee), Somerville, Tennessee
Fayette County Courthouse and Jail, La Grange, Texas
Fayette County Courthouse Square Historic District
 Fayette County Courthouse (West Virginia), Fayetteville, West Virginia